The following is a full list of members of the Order of Ontario, both past and current, in order of their date of appointment.

Members

1987 
John Black Aird – 23rd Lieutenant Governor of Ontario
Aline Akeson – poverty activist 
J. M. S. Careless – historian
Hon. William G. Davis – Premier of Ontario (1971–1985)
 Celia Franca – founder of National Ballet of Canada
Harry Gairey – civil rights activist 
Duncan Gordon
Roger Guindon – university administrator
Dianne Harkin – founder of Women for the Survival of Agriculture 
Cleeve Horne – portrait painter and sculptor
Benjamin Sinclair Johnson – sprinter
Franc Joubin – prospector and geologist
Johnny Lombardi – pioneer of multicultural broadcasting in Canada
Clifford McIntosh – public speaker, author and founder of the Quetico Centre
Oskar Morawetz – composer
John Polanyi – Nobel laureate
Al Purdy – poet
James Swail – researcher and developer of assistive devices for the blind
Bessie Touzel – social worker and teacher
Whipper Billy Watson – professional wrestler, supporter of children's charities

1988 
Alex Baumann – competitive swimmer, Olympic medalist
June Callwood – journalist, author and social activist
Floyd Chalmers – editor, publisher and philanthropist
Robertson Davies – novelist, playwright, critic, journalist, professor, founding Master of Massey College
Reva Gerstein – first woman Chancellor of the University of Western Ontario (1992–96)
Charlotte Lemieux – teacher and public servant
Walter Frederick Light – business executive
Gordon Lightfoot – singer and songwriter
Dennis McDermott – trade unionist, Canadian Director of the United Auto Workers (1968–78), and president of the Canadian Labour Congress (1978–86)
Pauline McGibbon – 22nd Lieutenant-Governor of Ontario
Don Moore – activist and immigration advocate 
Bernice Noblitt – President of the Federated Women's Institute of Canada, women's rights activist and teacher
John C. Parkin – architect
Beryl Potter – activist for the rights of people with disabilities
John Josiah Robinette – lawyer
Murray Ross – founding president of York University
Robert B. Salter – Orthopedic surgeon and professor
John Weinzweig – composer

1989 
Louis Applebaum – composer
 John Bassett – publisher, media baron
 Dorothy Beam – advocate for the rights of the Deaf
 Leonard Birchall – decorated RCAF pilot (World War II)
 Violet Blackman – black rights activist  
 Morley Callaghan – author & playwright
 Paul Charbonneau – priest and founder of Brentwood Recovery Home
 Charles George Drake – neurosurgeon
 Anne Gribben – nurse and labour activist 
 James Ham – engineer, administrator and President of the University of Toronto 
 Kenneth Hare – climatologist
 Daniel Iannuzzi – broadcaster
 Norman Jewison – film director, producer, actor and founder of the Canadian Film Centre
 Basil Johnston – Anishinaabe writer & storyteller
 Cliff Lumsdon – world champion marathon swimmer
 Janet Murray – nun, educator and hospital administrator
 Laure Rièse – educator; first female faculty member to obtain a PhD from University of Toronto
 Harry Thode – geochemist, nuclear chemist, and academic administrator
 Eberhard Zeidler – architect

1990 
James Archibald – veterinary surgeon, organ transplant pioneer 
Margaret Atwood – writer
John Bailey – physician and community organizer  
Maxwell Enkin – refugee advocate 
Maureen Forrester – contralto
Ursula Franklin – metallurgist, research physicist, author and educator
George R. Gardiner – businessman, philanthropist and co-founder of the Gardiner Museum
Stanley Grizzle – trade union activist
Karen Kain – dancer
Vicki Keith – marathon swimmer
Wilbert Keon – heart surgeon, scientific researcher
Dr. Robert McClure – surgeon, missionary, Moderator of the United Church of Canada (1968–71), social activist
Roland Michener – 20th Governor-General of Canada
Roderick Moran – paediatric dentist and organizer of specialized care clinics for disabled children 
Brian Orser – figure skater (Olympic medallist/world champion)
Clifford Pilkey – trade union leader
Wilfrid Sarazin 
Herbert Smith – engineer and educator 
Kathleen Taylor – the first woman to chair the board of a major Canadian bank
Jean Woodsworth – social worker, women's and seniors' rights activist

1991 
Gerald Barbeau
John Basmajian – scientist
Elisabeth Bednar
Agnes Benidickson – first female chancellor of Queen's University
Liona Boyd – classical guitarist
Clara Bernhardt – writer, poet and composer 
A. J. Casson – artist, member of the Group of Seven
Clifford Chadderton – veteran (World War II), CEO of The War Amps
Frances Dafoe – figure skater, World Champion and Olympic medallist
Dora de Pedery-Hunt – artist, designer of coins for Royal Canadian Mint
John Craig Eaton – businessman
John Robert Evans – pediatrician, academic, businessperson, civic leader, founding dean of McMaster University Faculty of Medicine
Timothy Findley – author & playwright
Mary Lou Fox
Wilbur Howard – minister, the first black person to graduate from Emmanuel College and be ordained in the United Church of Canada
William Goldwin Carrington Howland – lawyer, judge and former Chief Justice of Ontario
Greta Kraus – Harpsichordist, pianist and teacher
Sim Fai Liu – doctor and founder of the Mon Sheong Foundation
Veronica O'Reilly 
Tom Patterson – founder of Stratford Festival of Canada
Walter Pitman – president of Ryerson Polytechnical Institute (1975–80)
Annabel Slaight – teacher, environmentalist and co-founder of OWL 
Arthur Solomon 
Louis Temporale – sculptor
George Rutherford Walker 
Lois Miriam Wilson – first female Moderator of the United Church of Canada (1980–82)

1992 
Lincoln Alexander – 24th Lieutenant Governor of Ontario
Bromley Armstrong – civil rights leader
Boris Berlin – pianist, music educator, arranger, and composer
Pierre Berton – author, journalist, TV personality
Suzanne Rochon-Burnett – first aboriginal person in Canada to own and operate a private commercial radio station
Linda Crabtree – writer, advocate and founder of CMT International
Stefan Dupré – economist, teacher and administrator 
William Hutt – actor
Germain Lemieux – folklorist and teacher
Arthur Martin – justice of the Court of Appeal for Ontario
Doris McCarthy – artist
Terry Meagher – human rights and labour activist 
Raymond Moriyama – architect
Fraser Mustard – physician and scientist
Oscar Peterson – jazz pianist
Serafina Petrone – writer, educator and philanthropist 
Nancy Pocock – activist, advocate for refugees and artist
Harry Rasky – documentary film producer
Judith Simser – teacher and advocate for the deaf
Rose Wolfe – Chancellor of the University of Toronto (1991–1997)

1993 
Roberta Bondar – astronaut
Pat Capponi – author and advocate for mental health issues and poverty issues
Jean-Gabriel Castel – law professor and Professor Emeritus at Osgoode Hall Law School
Tirone David – cardiac surgeon
Colin diCenzo
Budhendra Doobay – cardiologist, heart surgeon and philanthropist 
Grace Hartman – first female mayor of Sudbury
Daniel G. Hill – civil servant, human rights specialist, and Black Canadian historian
Thomas Hill – curator, writer, art historian, artist, actor, producer and traditional eskanye singer
Karl Kaiser – wine maker and ice wine pioneer 
Murray Koffler – businessman and philanthropist
Benjamin Lu – chemical engineering professor and Professor Emeritus at University of Ottawa
Abbyann Lynch – teacher and ethics consultant 
Lois Marshall – concert soprano
Isabel McLaughlin – artist
Gunther Plaut – author
Paul Rekai – doctor and co-founder of Central Hospital
Mary Stuart – administrator and volunteer 
William Tamblyn – engineer, administrator and first President of Lakehead University
Shirley Van Hoof 
Donald J.P. Ziraldo – wine maker and ice wine pioneer

1994 
Prasanta Basu – ophthalmologist, researcher and director of the Eye Bank of Canada (1955-1991)
Joan Chalmers – philanthropist
Martin Connell – businessman and philanthropist
Elsie Cressman – missionary and midwife
Lorna deBlicquy – aviator and Canada's first woman Civil Aviation Flight Inspector
Selma Edelstone 
Nicholas Goldschmidt – conductor, first music director of the Royal Conservatory Opera School (University of Toronto)
Martha Henry – actress
Conrad Lavigne – media executive
Donald C. MacDonald – politician
Flora MacDonald – politician
Edwin Mirvish – businessman, philanthropist and theatrical impresario
Alice Munro – writer
Phil Nimmons – jazz clarinetist, composer, bandleader
Ted Nolan – hockey player and coach
George Pedersen – president of University of Western Ontario (1985 to 1994)
Ronald Satok – artist
Nelles Silverthorne – pediatrician, researcher and vaccine pioneer 
Elizabeth Thorn 
Bryan Walls – dental surgeon, historian and author

1995 
Doris Anderson – author, journalist, women's rights activist
Tim Armstrong –  public policy advisor, legal counsel and author
Harry Arthurs – lawyer, academic, labour law scholar
Douglas Bassett – media executive
Thomas Beck – entrepreneur and philanthropist 
Laurent Belanger – entrepreneur and administrator 
Marlene Castellano – teacher and researcher 
Shirley Carr – labour leader, first woman president the Canadian Labour Congress.
Angela Coughlan – internationally ranked competitive swimmer, Olympic medallist
Corinne Devlin – gynecologist and teacher 
Robert Filler – surgeon and researcher 
Ted Hargreaves – businessman and charitable fundraiser
Elmer Iseler – conductor of the Toronto Mendelssohn Choir, founder of the Festival Singers of Canada and the Elmer Iseler Singers
Heather Johnston – first lay woman president of the Canadian Council of Churches
Vim Kochhar – former senator and co-founder of Rotary Cheshire Homes
Linda Lundström – fashion designer
Lloyd Perry – lawyer
Natavarlal Shah – physician, co-founder of the Sikh Education Research Centre and co-founder of the Mount Carmel Home
William Somerville – public servant and administrator

1996 
Avie Bennett – businessman and philanthropist
Huguette Burroughs – journalist and public servant 
Herbert Carnegie – hockey player
Jesse Davidson & John Davidson – co-founders of the charity Jesse's Journey 
Clifford R. Evans – labour leader
Gregory Evans – judge
Ellen Louks Fairclough – first female member of the Canadian federal Cabinet
Amber Foulkes 
Charles Godfrey – physician, professor and former MPP
Kamala-Jean Gopie – political activist
Chris Hadfield – astronaut
Tommy Hunter – country singer
Arlette Lefebvre – child psychologist at the Hospital for Sick Children
Jeffrey Wan-shu Lo 
Janet Lunn – children's writer
Trisha Romance – artist 
Etienne Saint-Aubin – lawyer
Ezra Schabas – musician, educator and author
Al Waxman – actor
William Wilkinson 
Doreen Wicks – humanitarian

1997 
John Brooks – founder of the John Brooks Community Foundation and Scholarship Fund
François Chamberland 
Audrey Cole – activist for people with disabilities
John Colicos – actor
William Coyle – aerospace pioneer 
Leslie Dan – businessman
Michael de Pencier – entrepreneur, environmental investor and publisher
Jack Diamond – architect, founding director of the Master of Architecture program at the University of Toronto
Charles Dubin – judge
Ralph Ellis – filmmaker, documentarian and administrator  
Larry Grossman – politician
Elizabeth Bradford Holbrook – portrait sculptor
Abbyann Lynch – medical ethicist
Ron Ianni –  lawyer, teacher and President of the University of Windsor
Roy Laine 
Moon Lum 
Kathleen Mann – teacher and choir director 
Judith Meeks 
Nancy Raeburn 
Jack Rabinovitch – philanthropist and founder of the Giller Prize
Richard Rohmer – writer
Bob Rumball – pastor and advocate for the deaf and those with special needs
Nalini Stewart – administrator 
Paul Tsai

1998 
Marion Anderson – Aboriginal band councillor
Bluma Appel – philanthropist, arts patron
Jean Ashworth Bartle – Founder and director of the Toronto Children's Chorus
Allan Leslie Beattie – lawyer, former chairman of the board for the Hospital for Sick Children
Irene Broadfoot – community activist
Norman Campbell – television director & producer, playwright
Armando Felice DeLuca – community activist
Claire O. Dimock – community activist
Ydessa Hendeles – Founder, director and curator of the Ydessa Hendeles Art Foundation and Grand Founder of the Art Gallery of Ontario (AGO)
Dr. Kenneth C. Hobbs – physician, international humanitarian
Hal Jackman – business leader, philanthropist, 24th Lieutenant Governor of Ontario, Chair of the Ontario Arts Council and Chancellor of the University of Toronto
Maureen Kempston Darkes – President and General Manager of General Motors Canada Ltd. and community activist
Marvelle Koffler – Founder of the Marvelle Koffler Breast Centre at Mount Sinai Hospital and the Koffler Centre for the Arts
Dr. Lap Cheung Lee – community activist
Andrée Lortie – advocate for the Francophone community
Knowlton Nash – journalist
Alfred U. Oakie – pioneer in traffic safety
Lloyd Seivright – activist
Masami Tsuruoka – sports figure
Thomas Leonard Wells – politician

1999 
William Blake – Community activist
Doris Boissoneau – Ojibwe language activist
Paul Michel Bosc – Wine-maker
Mavis Elaine Burke – Educator, advocate for early childhood education and community activist
Clarice Chalmers – Philanthropist
Keshav Chandaria – philanthropist
Susan Charness – disability-rights activist
Sam John Ciccolini – entrepreneur and philanthropist
Esther Farlinger – charity fundraiser
Victor Feldbrill – violinist, orchestral conductor and champion of Canadian music
Dr. James Ferguson – medical researcher
Maxwell Goldhar – businessman, philanthropist
Doris Lau – financial adviser, charity fundraiser, goodwill ambassador for Ontario and scholarship sponsor
Eileen McGregor – community activist
Winnie "Roach" Leuszler – first Canadian to swim the English Channel, sportswoman
Alice King Sculthorpe – community activist
Dr. Bette Stephenson – physician, founding member of the College of Family Physicians of Canada, former Ontario Progressive Conservative MPP and cabinet minister
Hin Cheung Tam – community activist
Gordie Tapp – entertainer
Anthony Toldo – industrialist, philanthropist, bicyclist 
Lisette Véron-Rainu – children's activist
Ken Watts – Founder of the Ontario Collegiate Drama Festival

2000 
Danielle Allen and Normand Pellerin – educators
Maggie Atkinson – Lawyer and AIDS activist
Marilyn Brooks – Fashion designer and philanthropist
Nickie Cassidy – activist on behalf of sufferers of multiple sclerosis
Ernie Checkeris – Educator and activist, Chancellor of Thorneloe University, Sudbury
George A. Cohon – Chicago-born lawyer; founder/senior chairman of McDonald's Restaurants of Canada; philanthropist
Lloyd Dennis – educator
William Andrew Dimma – businessman and educator
Kildare Dobbs – writer, journalist
Joyce Fee – educator and community activist
Dr. Robert Freedom – physician, professor and author
Donald H. Harron – journalist, author and actor
Jane Jacobs – U.S.-born naturalized Canadian author; Toronto-based urban philosopher
Stephan Lewar – venture capitalist, financier and philanthropist
Janet MacInnis – fundraiser and volunteer
Frank Miller – politician (former Premier of Ontario)
Betty Oliphant – founder of the National Ballet School of Canada
J. Robert S. Prichard – educator, author and former President of the University of Toronto
Joseph Radmore – athlete, member of the Canadian Paralympic Team
Margaret M. Risk – nurse
Haroon Siddiqui – journalist, columnist
Dr. Calvin Stiller – physician
Donald A. Stuart – gold and silversmith
Dr. Lap-Chee Tsui – molecular geneticist; Vice-Chancellor of the University of Hong Kong
Irving Ungerman – entrepreneur, boxer and activist

2001 
Richard M. Alway – President/Vice-Chancellor of St. Michael's College, promoter of Catholic-Anglican dialogue in Canada
Gwen M. Boniface – first female Ontario Provincial Police Commissioner
Rita Burak – public servant
Danielle Campo – athlete, member of the Canadian Paralympic Team
Michael "Pinball" Clemons – President and former player of the Toronto Argonauts
Ken Danby – artist
Terry Daynard – researcher, teacher
Terrence J. Donnelly – fundraiser for cardiac research and development
Gail J. Donner – Dean of the Faculty of Nursing at the University of Toronto; Executive Director of the Registered Nurses Association of Ontario
Fredrik Stefan Eaton – businessman, community volunteer
C. Dennis Flynn – elected official, fundraiser, community volunteer and war veteran
Prof. Dr. Nicolas D. Georganas – pioneer in multimedia medical communications and telelearning
Helen Haddow – community activist
Paul Kells – workplace safety advocate
Jake Lamoureux – Volunteer with young people
Alexina Louie – composer of classical music
Lewis W. MacKenzie, Major General (Retired) – Ontario Director of ICROSS Canada, the International Community for the Relief of Starvation and Suffering
Signe and Robert McMichael – builders and donors of the McMichael Canadian Art Collection of Group of Seven paintings in Kleinburg
Dusty Miller – patron of the arts, artistic director of the Cambrian Players
David Mirvish – leader in the development and promotion of the visual arts in Ontario
Peter Nesbitt Oliver – historian
James S. Redpath – Chancellor of Nipissing University
Dr. Donald T. Stuss – clinical psychologist, neuropsychologist and behavioural neuroscientist
Bhausaheb Ubale – human rights activist
Dr. Carin Wittnich – University of Toronto professor and researcher
Madeline Ziniak – Vice-president and executive producer of CFMT television, promoter of multiculturalism

2002 
Peggy Baker – dancer, choreographer and teacher; founder of the Toronto-based Dancemakers
James Bartleman – Lieutenant Governor of Ontario
Marilyn Bell DiLascio – first person to swim Lake Ontario (1954)
David Blackwood – artist
Frederick M. Catzman – lawyer
Austin Clarke – author, teacher, mentor, writer-in-residence at the University of Toronto; recipient of the 2002 Giller Prize
Barbara Chilcott – actress
Mario Cortellucci – fundraiser
Patricia Freeman Marshall – community activist
Irving R. Gerstein – businessman, philanthropist
Joan Goldfarb – teacher of adults with disabilities
Walter Gretzky – Ambassador for the Canadian National Institute for the Blind and the Heart and Stroke Foundation of Canada and father of Wayne Gretzky
Phyllis M. Grosskurth – Professor emerita and Fellow, Massey College, University of Toronto; 1965 winner of the Governor General's Award for non-fiction
Dr. Raymond O. Heimbecker – cardiovascular surgeon
Patrick John Keenan – volunteer
Tom Kneebone – actor, playwright
Burton Kramer – graphic designer
Dr. Benson Lau – physician and teacher
J. Douglas Lawson – Vice-Chairman of the Ontario Arts Council
Rhéal Leroux – Volunteer, former president of the Festival Franco-Ontarien
Dr. William K. Lindsay – surgeon and professor
Joan Murray – art historian, former director of the Robert McLaughlin Gallery in Oshawa
Dr. Mark J. Poznansky – President and Scientific Director of the Robarts Research Institute
Dr. Joanna Santa Barbara – physician, national president of the Physicians for Global Survival
Thomas H. B. Symons – founder of Trent University and its president and vice-chancellor (from 1961–72)
Lela Wilson – artists' rights activist

2003 
Joseph J. Barnicke – businessman and philanthropist
John Kim Bell – musician, promoter of Aboriginal culture
Col. Archibald J. D. Brown – businessman, community activist
Dorothy Ellen Duncan – Executive Director of The Ontario Historical Society, teacher, curator
Julian Fantino – police officer, former Chief of Police for London, York Region and Toronto; Ontario's Commissioner of Emergency Management; now Commissioner of the Ontario Provincial Police
Mary Germain – community activist
Dr. Avis E. Glaze – teacher, administrator, writer and international educator
Dr. Benjamin Goldberg – psychiatrist
Doris Grinspun – Executive Director of the Registered Nurses' Association of Ontario (RNAO)
George Gross – Corporate Sports Editor of Sun Media Corporation
Macklin Hancock – pioneer in urban planning, urban design and landscape architecture
Ryan Hreljac – elementary school student, committed to raising funds for clean water and sanitation projects around the world since the age of six
Dr. Frederic Jackman – psychologist
Laura Louise Legge – lawyer, community activist
Helen Lu – volunteer, organizer and fundraiser for charitable organizations in Toronto
Dr. Donald Mackay – Professor of Environmental and Resource Studies at Trent University, and director of the Canadian Environmental Modelling Centre
Hon. Jack Marshall – Second World War veteran, Member of Parliament, Senator, and activist
Anna Porter – writer, book publisher
Hon. Robert Keith Rae – Member of Parliament, former Premier of Ontario, lawyer
Eric Wilfrid Robinson – promoter of adult education
Diane Simard Broadfoot – community activist
Joan Thompson – volunteer
Rita Tsang – businesswoman
Hon. Mabel Van Camp – judge; first woman on the Supreme Court of Ontario
Mike Weir – golfer; first Canadian to win the Masters Golf Tournament
Kirk Albert Walter Wipper – environmentalist, heritage conservationist and fitness advocate (died 2011)
William John Withrow – former director of the Art Gallery of Ontario (AGO)

2004 
 Dr. Tyseer Aboulnasr – engineer
 Jeff Adams – Paralympian and world champion in wheelchair sports
 Mohammad Azhar Ali Khan – journalist, multiculturalism expert
 Diana Alli – outreach worker
 Patricia Ann Arato – aphasia care volunteer
 Dr. Robin F. Badgley – sociologist, founder of Department of Behavioural Science at the University of Toronto
 Iain Baxter& – conceptual artist
 Louise Binder – speaker on HIV/AIDS issues
 Richard Bradshaw – director of the Canadian Opera Company
 Leonard A. Braithwaite – lawyer and former MPP
 Dr. Inez Elliston – educator, community volunteer
 Adele Fifield – director of "The War Amps"
 Joan Francolini – community volunteer
 Sheldon Galbraith – figure skating coach
 Dr. Allan Gross – Professor of Surgery, Faculty of Medicine, University of Toronto
 Andrea Hansen – violinist
 Joyce Ann Lange – advocate for the hearing impaired
 Delores Lawrence – leading female entrepreneur and philanthropist
 René J. Marin – respected Francophone jurist
 David McGirr – community volunteer in Northern Ontario
 Anthony Pawson – scientist known for research of signal transduction in cells
 Kim Phuc Phan Thi – Vietnamese napalm victim
 John Rochon – marksman
 Chandrakant Shah – public health educator
 Gordon Surgeoner – entomologist specializing in insect transmitted diseases
 Galen Weston – businessman in food services sector
 Reverend Monsignor Lawrence Anthony Wnuk – outreach worker to the Polish community
 James Young – former Chief Coroner
 Margaret Zeidler – architect

2005 
 Naomi Alboim – public servant
 Ron Barbaro – community service
 Harold Brathwaite – educator
 Boris Brott – conductor (Hamilton Philharmonic Orchestra)
 Donald Carr – lawyer
 Brian Desbiens – educator
 Thomas Dignan – Aboriginal healthcare advocate
 Deborah Ellis – children's author, human rights advocate
 Hughes Eng – community service
 Brenda L. Gallie – Expert in the treatment of retinoblastoma
 Dorothy Griffiths – researcher, educator
 William A. Harshaw – fundraiser for Parkinson's disease
 John Honderich – former editor and publisher, Toronto Star
 Leon Katz – engineer, medical inventor
 Gisèle Lalonde – educator
 Mike Lazaridis – founder, Research in Motion; inventor, BlackBerry
 Beatrice Levis – advocate for social justice
 Nancy Lockhart – Chair, Ontario Science Centre
 Ernest McCulloch – pioneer in stem cell biology
 Lillian McGregor – teacher of aboriginal languages
 Sher Ali Mirza – engineer
 Ratna Omidvar – former president, Ontario Council of Agencies Serving Immigrants
 Sandra Rotman – philanthropist
 Mark Starowicz – broadcaster, journalist
 Marlene Streit – professional golfer
 Ronald W. Taylor – physician in sports medicine; team physician to the Toronto Blue Jays
 James Till – pioneer in stem cell biology
 John Walker Whiteside – assistant crown attorney
 Moses Znaimer – broadcaster

2007 
 Thomas J. Bitove – businessman, community activist
 John Richard Bond – University of Toronto astrophysicist and cosmologist
 Bernice and Rolland Desnoyers – foster parents for children and youth since 1960
 Peter J. George – economist, author, President and Vice Chancellor of McMaster University in Hamilton and Chair of the Council of Ontario Universities
 Christopher A. Harris – cofounder of the Ottawa-Carleton Immigrant Services Organization, the National Capital Alliance on Race Relations and the Jamaican Ottawa Community Association
 Peter Herrndorf – Broadcasting executive
 Rebecca F. Jamieson – First Nations activist
 Max Keeping – Ottawa media personality
 M. David Lepofsky – disability activist
 Dr. Tak W. Mak – biomedical scientist
 J. William McConkey – University of Windsor professor
 Dr. Roderick R. McInnes – University of Toronto professor and senior scientist with the Hospital for Sick Children
 R. Roy McMurtry – former Chief Justice of Ontario and Attorney General of Ontario
 Lorraine Monk – author, photographer, and artist
 Albert Kai-Wing Ng – graphic designer and creator of graphic design accreditation
 Adeena Niazi – helping newcomers settle in Canada
 Gordon M. Nixon – President/CEO of the Royal Bank of Canada
 Margaret Helen Ogilvie – Chancellor's Professor of Law at Carleton University
 Eva Olsson – Holocaust survivor
 Marlene Ann Pierre – Aboriginal activist
 Dr. Frances A. Shepherd – University of Toronto professor
 Janice Gross Stein – scholar, academic
 Paul-François Sylvestre – novelist, researcher and mentor
 William Thorsell – Director/CEO of the Royal Ontario Museum
 Dr. David Walde – Director of the Oncology Program
 Dr. Paul Walfish – University of Toronto professor and senior consultant

2008 
Reference:
 Dr. Michael Baker – physician, cancer researcher
 Dr. Sheela Basrur – Former Chief Medical Officer of Ontario
George Brady – human rights advocate, public speaker and Auschwitz survivor
Jack Chiang – journalist, community service
Tony Dean – Secretary of the Cabinet, credited with improving the Ontario Public Service
Mary Dickson – lawyer, educator and advocate for people with disabilities
Noel Edison – Artistic Director of the Elora Festival and the conductor of the Toronto Mendelssohn Choir
Frank Fernandes – Toronto businessman and volunteer
Jean-Robert Gauthier – for his work in advancing French-language education
Sam George – Native Canadians' rights activist
Heather Gibson – educator specializing in American Sign Language (ASL)
Robert A. Gordon – served as president of Humber College
Gordon Gray – philanthropist
Susan Hoeg – community service on behalf of the Georgina Island Chippewas
Claude Lamoureux – served as president and CEO of the Ontario Teachers' Pension Plan
Patrick Le Sage – served as Chief Justice for the Ontario Superior Court of Justice
Dr. Joe MacInnis – physician, scientist and undersea explorer
Dr. David MacLennan – biomedical scientist, expert in biochemistry, genetics and physiology of muscle function
Lorna Marsden – served as President of York University and of Wilfrid Laurier University, and a former senator.
David Peterson – former Premier of Ontario
Ed Ratushny – expert on the Canadian judiciary
Rosemary Sadlier – author and president of the Ontario Black History Society
 Dr. Fuad Sahin –  for his contributions to community service; founder of the International Development and Relief Foundation.
Barbara Ann Scott-King – Olympic champion figure skater in 1948
Ellen Seligman – for contributions to publishing and support of Canadian authors
Peter Silverman – broadcaster and consumer advocate
David Smith – philanthropist
Ted Szilva – originator and developer of the Big Nickel Project
Mary Welsh – for 35 years of community and civic contributions

2009 
Reference:
Constance Backhouse – legal scholar and historian
Dr. Philip Berger – physician and leader in the fields of urban medicine, addiction, homelessness and HIV/AIDS care
Lawrence Bloomberg – businessman and philanthropist 
Lesley Jane Boake – educator and founder of Canine Opportunity, People Empowerment
Dr. Helen Chan – clinical oncologist 
Peter Crossgrove – businessman and charity fundraiser 
Mike DeGagné – community leader and advocate for Aboriginal peoples
Levente Diosady – a leader in the field of food process engineering
Fraser Dougall – media owner and philanthropist
Jacques Flamand – writer and promoter of Franco-Ontarian literature 
Jean Gagnon – an advocate for the health and safety of workers
Paul Godfrey – Chair of Metro Toronto (1973–1984), businessman
Peter Godsoe – businessman
Ovid Jackson – provincial politician
Dr. Kellie Leitch – orthopaedic pediatric surgeon; Assoc. Professor of Medicine, University of Toronto
Gerry Lougheed, Jr. – funeral director and volunteer 
Diana Mady Kelly – theatre director and teacher of dramatic arts
Naseem Mahdi – spiritual leader
Dr. Samantha Nutt – Executive Director, War Child Canada
Dr. James Orbinski – physician; Associate Professor of Medicine, University of Toronto; President of Médecins Sans Frontières (1998–2001)
Bonnie Patterson – former president of Ryerson University
Shirley Peruniak – park naturalist and conservationist 
Alice Porter – nurse and missionary
Ken Shaw – news anchor (CTV) and philanthropist
Janet Stewart – lawyer and philanthropist
Shirley Thomson – civil servant
George Turnbull – expert in financial services and philanthropist 
Dr. Mladen Vranic – physician and researcher 
Dr. Anne-Marie Zajdlik – physician and female AIDS activist

2010 
Reference:
Suhayya Abu-Hakima – technology entrepreneur and volunteer
Russell Bannock – fighter pilot and Second World War commander
Gail Beck – child and adolescent psychiatrist and champion of the HPV public immunization program
Joseph Chin – medical pioneer and a leader in the prevention and treatment of prostate cancer
Lynn Factor – social worker
Gerald Fagan – choral conductor, teacher and mentor
Nigel Fisher – former president of UNICEF Canada
Jacques Flamand 
Lillie Johnson – Ontario's first black director of public health
Ignat Kaneff – developer and philanthropist
Mobeenuddin Hassan Khaja – founder of the Association of Progressive Muslims of Ontario and Canada
Elizabeth Ann Kinsella – founder of the Youville Centre
Huguette Labelle – civil servant and the first woman to lead the Red Cross in Canada
Elizabeth Le Geyt – writer and birdwatcher 
Clare Lewis – former Crown attorney and judge
Louise Logue – expert advisor in the field of crime prevention
Gordon McBean – scientist and environmentalist
Wilma Morrison – educator, historian and founder of the Niagara Black History Association
James Orbinski 
Coulter Osborne – lawyer and former associate chief of justice
Chris Paliare – civil litigator
Gilles Patry – consultant, researcher, and a university administrator
Dave Shannon – lawyer
Molly Shoichet – researcher
Howard Sokolowski – leader in the home building industry and philanthropist
Edward Sonshine – entrepreneur and philanthropist
Reginald Stackhouse – author, retired politician and co-founder of Centennial College
David Staines – scholar, professor, literary critic and writer
Martin Teplitsky – mediator-arbitrator, Lawyer and founder of the Lawyers Feed the Hungry program
Dave Toycen – president and CEO of World Vision Canada
John Ronald Wakegijig – launched a mental health program for First Nations youth and established Rainbow Lodge
Elizabeth Hillman Waterston – researcher and writer

2011 
Reference: 
 Peter Adams – politician, professor and volunteer
 Dr. Anna Banerji – helped create the Immigrant Health and Infectious Disease Clinic and the Canadian Refugee Health Conference
 Dr. Sandra E. Black – cognitive neurologists specializing in stroke and dementia
 Paul Cavalluzzo – Lawyer, Senior Partner, Cavalluzzo Shilton McIntyre Cornish LLP, Barristers and Solicitors
 Catherine Colquhoun – volunteer
 David Crombie – three-term mayor of Toronto
 Nathalie Des Rosiers – legal expert
 Marcel Desautels – philanthropist 
 Sara Diamond – artist and president of OCAD University
 Charles Garrad – archaeologist, historian, and scholar
 Peter Gilgan – developer and philanthropist 
 Frank Hayden – created Special Olympics International
 Donald Jackson – world gold medalist in male figure skating
 Zeib Jeeva – founding member of the Nelson Mandela Children's Fund
 Howard McCurdy – scientist, civil rights activist and MPP
 Arthur McDonald – physicist
 Noella Milne – lawyer and volunteer
 Suzanne Pinel – French-language educator and television personality 
 Ucal Powell – head of Ontario's Carpenter's Union 
 Barbara Reid – children's author and illustrator
 Alison Rose – documentary filmmaker and reporter
 Linda Schuyler – co-creator and executive producer of the Degrassi television franchise
 Dr. Louis Siminovitch – geneticist
 Rahul Singh – founder of GlobalMedic
 Connie Smith – journalist, television host and teacher
 The Honourable Ray Stortini – retired Superior Court Judge
 John Tory – lawyer, business leader, community activist, broadcaster and former MPP

2012 
Reference:
 Dr. Izzeldin Abuelaish – physician, human rights and peace activist
 Michael Burgess – actor and singer
 Mark Cohon – commissioner of the Canadian Football League
 Glen Cook – businessman and restored and preserved the historic Puce River Black Community Cemetery
 Stephen Cook – computer scientist
 Phyllis Creighton – chair of the Ontario Mental Health Foundation and the Addiction Research Foundation's clinical institute
 Michael Davies – businessman and philanthropist
 Ronald Deibert – director of the Citizen Lab at the University of Toronto's Munk School of Global Affairs
 Dr. Rory Fisher – headed the Department of Extended Care at Sunnybrook Hospital in Toronto for almost 20 years
 Anne Golden – administrator
 Joan Green – Toronto Board of Education's first female CEO
 Dr. Vladimir Hachinski – neurologist and teacher
 John D. Honsberger – lawyer
 Dr. Shafique Keshavjee – thoracic surgeon and world leader in lung transplantation
 Fr. Joseph MacDonald – founder of Poverello Charities Ontario
 Don MacKinnon – advocate of Ontario's energy industry
 Deepa Mehta – filmmaker and women's rights activist  
 Vincent Pawis – Native Inmate Liaison Officer 
 Sr. Helen Petrimoulx – advocate for refugees
 The Honourable Sydney Robins – Supreme Court of Ontario judge
 Dr. Gail Robinson – psychiatrist, professor and advocate, she co-founded Canada's first rape crisis centre
 Mamdouh Shoukri – president and vice-chancellor of York University
 Barry Smit – professor and climate change researcher 
 Brian Stewart – reporter and foreign correspondent
 Frank Tierney – teacher and founder of the Borealis Press and Tecumseh Press

2013 
Reference:
Irving Abella – scholar and historian
Dr. Mohit Bhandari  – orthopaedic surgeon and researcher
Paul Burston  – public servant 
George E. Carter – lawyer and the first Canadian-born Black judge
Ellen Campbell – founder and CEO of the Canadian Centre for Abuse Awareness
Penny Collenette – leader and innovator
Ronald Common – President of Sault College
Paul Corkum – physicist and the father of attosecond science
David Cronenberg – filmmaker
Alvin Curling – first Black Speaker of the Ontario Legislature
Allison Fisher – Executive Director of Wabano Centre for Aboriginal Health
Claude Gingras – former chair of the Fondation Franco-Ontarienne
Avvy Yao Yao Go – lawyer
Piers Handling – Director and CEO of the Toronto International Film Festival
Paul Henderson – hockey player and mentor
Justin Hines – singer, songwriter and founder of Justin Hines Foundation
Ronald Jamieson – former Senior Vice President of Aboriginal Banking at BMO Financial Group
Jeanne Lamon – Music Director of Toronto's Tafelmusik Baroque Orchestra
Frances Noronha – civil servant
Lyn McLeod – former leader of the Ontario Liberal Party
Diane Morrison – former Executive Director of the Mission, an Ottawa homeless shelter
Steve Paikin – journalist and television host
Dr. James Rutka – pediatric neurosurgeon and researcher 
Adel Sedra – engineering scholar, professor and administrator 
Toby Tanenbaum – philanthropist and volunteer

2014 
Reference:
 Mary Anne Chambers – Cabinet Minister and MPP
 Ming-Tat Cheung – cardiologist and medical researcher
 Michael Dan – neurosurgeon and philanthropists 
 Don Drummond – economist
 Rick Green – performer, writer and advocate for people with ADD
 Patrick Gullane – head and neck surgeon
 Joseph Halstead – civil servant and administrator 
 Alis Kennedy – Métis leader
 Sylvie Lamoureux – teacher, scholar, and academic
 Gilles LeVasseur – lawyer, economist and professor
 Gary Levy – founding Director of the Multi-Organ Transplant Program at Toronto General Hospital 
 Sidney B. Linden – former Chief Justice of the Ontario Court of Justice
 Barbara MacQuarrie – advocate for women's rights
 Eva Marszewski – founder and Executive Director of Peacebuilders International
 Marilyn McHarg – Co-founder and former Executive Director of the Canadian branch of Doctors Without Borders/Médécins Sans Frontières
 Hans Messner – scientist and physician
 James Murray – philanthropist
 Robert Nixon – former Minister of Finance and leader of the Ontario Liberal Party
 Dhun Noria – surgical pathologist
 Maryka Omatsu – retired Ontario Court Justice and Canada's first Asian-Canadian female judge
 Charles Pachter – artist
 John Ralston Saul – writer and lecturer
 Najmul Siddiqui – entrepreneur, community leader and philanthropist
 Jeffrey Turnbull – physician, humanitarian and Medical Director of Ottawa Inner City Health
 Dolores Wawia – pioneer in native education
 David Williams – Canadian astronaut, physician and scientist
 Warren Winkler – former labour lawyer, mediator and Chief Justice of Ontario

2015 
Reference:
 Hugh Allen  Surgeon and Specialist in Obstetrics and Gynecology
 Susan Bailey  Nurse, Teacher and Pioneer in Palliative care
 Isabel Bassett  Former Ontario Cabinet Minister and MPP
 Monica Elaine Campbell  Pioneer in the Development of Palliative Care Services for the Deaf in Ontario
 Dennis Chippa  Community Leader and Humanitarian
 Wendy Craig  Professor of Psychology at Queen's University and Expert on the Prevention of Bullying
 Gordon Cressy  Former Politician, Public Servant, Humanitarian, Mentor and Youth Advocate
 Madeline Edwards  Community Advocate and Founding Member of the Congress of Black Women of Mississauga and Area Chapter
 Hoda ElMaraghy  Professor and Director of the Intelligent Manufacturing Systems Center at the University of Windsor
 Robert Fowler  Critical Care Physician at Sunnybrook Health Sciences Centre and Associate Professor of Medicine and Critical Care Medicine at the University of Toronto
 Herbert Gaisano  Professor and Researcher at the University of Toronto's Faculty of Medicine and Gastroenterologists
 John Gignac  Veteran Fire Captain
 June Girvan  Founder of the J'Nikira Dinqinesh Education Centre in Ottawa
 Beverley Gordon  Founding CEO of The Safehaven Project for Community Living
 Richard Gosling  community leader and youth advocate
 Stephen Goudge  Former Judge in the Court of Appeal for Ontario
 Anton Kuerti  Concert Pianist and Composer
 Rita Letendre  Painter, Muralist and Printmaker
 Jackie Maxwell  Artistic Director of the Shaw Festival
 Errol Mendes  Professor of Law at the University of Ottawa, Author and Advocate for the Universal Application of Human Rights
 Julian Nedzelski  Ear, Nose and Throat Specialist and Head and Neck Surgeon at the Sunnybrook Health Sciences Centre and a Pioneer of Cochlear Implants in Ontario
 Mike Parkhill  Founder of SayITFirst
 René Pitre  Business Leader and Advocate of French Language Culture, Community and Education in Ontario
 Donna Trella  Founder of Reach for the Rainbow
 Stanley Zlotkin  A Nutrition Specialist and Researcher at The Hospital for Sick Children

2016 
Reference:
 Peter A. Adamson  Surgical Specialist in Otolaryngology
 Mehran Anvari  Surgical Robotics Pioneer
 Donovan Bailey  Track and Field Icon
 Jennifer Bond  Professor of Law and Human Rights Advocate
 Angèle Brunelle  Advocate for Northwest Ontario's Francophone Community
 Ronald F. Caza  Lawyer and Defender of Francophone Linguistic Rights
 Anthony Kam Chuen Chan  Pediatric Hematologist and Scientist
 Ethel Côté  Entrepreneur, Volunteer and Community leader
 Jim Estill  Entrepreneur and Philanthropist
 Carol Finlay  Anglican Priest and Education Advocate
 Cheryl Forchuk  Scholar in the Fields of Homelessness, Poverty and Mental Health
 Dorothée Gizenga  International Development Expert and Human Rights Advocate
 Shirley Greenberg  Lawyer and Women's Rights Advocate
 Robert Pio Hajjar  Motivational Speaker
 Greta Hodgkinson  Prima Ballerina
 Dorothy Anna Jarvis  Pediatrician
 Lisa LaFlamme  Broadcast Journalist
 M.G. Venkatesh Mannar  Expert in Food Science Technologies and Nutrition
 Ernest Matton (Little Brown Bear)  Community Capacity Builder and Spiritual Ambassador
 Dennis O'Connor  former Associate Chief Justice of Ontario
 David Pearson  Professor and Promoter of Science Communication
 Fran Rider  Women's Hockey Advocate
 Beverley Salmon  Anti-Racism and Community Activist
 Hugh Segal  Public Servant
 Helga Stephenson  Arts Administrator and Human Rights Activist
 Margo Timmins  Vocalist

2017 
Reference:
Dr. Upton Allen  pediatric infectious disease specialist
Daniel Aykroyd  actor and entrepreneur
Dr. Alan Bernstein  cancer researcher and research leader
Dr. David Cechetto  neuroscientist and director of international medical development projects
Dr. Peter Chang  lawyer and psychiatrist
The Honourable Sandra Chapnik  lawyer and judge
Dr. Tom Chau  biomedical engineer
Dr. Dorothy Cotton  psychologist and mental health advocate
Peter Dinsdale  Anishinaabe community leader
Leslie Fagan  singer and promoter of Canadian music
Michael Geist  scholar and public intellectual
Shashi Kant   professor of forest resource economics
Myrtha Lapierre  retired nursing professor
Floyd Laughren  former MPP and Finance Minister
Michael Lee-Chin  entrepreneur and philanthropist
Gail Nyberg  former Daily Bread Food Bank executive director and former school trustee
Dr. Dilkhush Panjwani  psychiatrist
Elder Geraldine Robertson  educator and advocate for residential school survivors
Allan Rock  former politician and UN Ambassador
Robert J. Sawyer  celebrated science-fiction author
Sandra Shamas  writer, performer and comedian
Elizabeth Sheehy  criminal law, scholar
Ilse Treurnicht   CEO and advocate for women and innovation

2018 
Reference:

 Jean Augustine  politician and social justice advocate
 Salah Bachir  businessman and philanthropist
 Dr. Sue Carstairs  veterinarian and conservationist
 Ralph Chiodo  entrepreneur and philanthropist
 Dr. Zane Cohen  colorectal surgeon
 Dwayne De Rosario  soccer player
 Michele DiEmanuele  CEO and public servant
 Philip Epstein  lawyer, scholar in family law
 Dr. Aaron Fenster  biomedical physicist
 Mark Freiman  lawyer, public servant and former Deputy Attorney General of Ontario
 Emmanuelle Gattuso  philanthropist
 Mary Gordon  social entrepreneur, educator and child advocate
 Edward Greenspon  journalist
 Spider Jones  sports journalist, author and member of the Canadian Boxing Hall of Fame
 Neal Jotham  animal welfare advocate
 Ozan Lago  physician, public speaker
 Dalton McGuinty  provincial politician and former Premier of Ontario 2003-2013
 Peter Menkes  businessman
 Janice O'Born  entrepreneur and philanthropist
 Cheryl Perea  child advocate
 Dr. Lyne Pitre  physician and educator
 Col. A. Britton (Brit) Smith  philanthropist

2019 
Reference:

 Melanie Adrian  law professor at Carleton University
 Roland Armitage  former Ontario politician and Member of the Canadian Horse Racing Hall of Fame
 Dr. Allan Carswell  physicist
 Helen Ching-Kircher  businesswoman and philanthropist
 John Colangeli  CEO of Lutherwood and Lutherwood Child and Family Foundation
 Nancy Coldham  businesswoman and philanthropist
 Sean Conway  former Ontario Cabinet Minister under David Peterson
 Clare Copeland  former Chair of Toronto Hydro
 Barbara Croall  composer and musician
 Lisa Farano  charity executive
 Geoffrey Fernie  biomedical engineer
 Dr. Allan Fox  neuroscientist
 John Freund  author and peace activist
 Susan Hay  journalist
 Dr. John Jennings  historian
 Dr. Marlys Koschinsky  Biochemistry Professor
 James W. Leech  former head of the Ontario Teachers' Pension Plan
 Audrey Loeb  law professor
 Dani Reiss  President and CEO of Canada Goose Incorporated
 Janis Rotman  philanthropist
 Linda Silver Dranoff  lawyer
 Joan Sutton Straus  journalist

2020 
Reference:

 Daniel Allen  public servant
 Dr. Joseph Raymond Buncic  physician at The Hospital for Sick Children
 Michael DeGasperis  property developer and philanthropist
 Dr. Raymond Desjardins  atmospheric scientist
 Ernest Eves  former Premier of Ontario 2002-2003
 Hershell Ezrin  public servant
 Carlo Fidani  businessman and philanthropist
 Karen Goldenberg  occupational therapist
 Michael Deane Harris  former Premier of Ontario 1995-2002
 Ellis Jacob  President and CEO of Cineplex Entertainment 
 Dr. Jing Jiang   engineering professor at the University of Western Ontario
 Dr. Shana O. Kelley  professor at the University of Toronto
 Dr. André Lapierre  linguistics professor at the University of Ottawa
 Dale Lastman  lawyer
 André M. Levesque  soldier
 Dr. Peter Liu  cardiologist
 Hazel McCallion  former Mayor of Mississauga 1978-2014
 Arden McGregor  humanitarian
 Janet McKelvy  philanthropist
 George McLean  artist
 Hon. Rosemary Moodie  Senator
 Hon. Robert W. Runciman  former Senator 2010-2017
 Dr. Marilyn Sonley  pediatric oncologist
 Ahmad Reza Tabrizi  philanthropist
 Hon. Karen M. Weiler  former judge

References

External links
 List of Order of Ontario recipients

Provincial and territorial orders of Canada